Robert Desgabets (1610–1678) was a French Cartesian philosopher and Benedictine prior, born in Ancemont.  He had published two book-length philosophical works in his lifetime, Considérations sur l'état présent de la controverse touchant le T. S. Sacrement de l'autel (Considerations on the present state of the controversy concerning the Eucharist) in 1671 and Critique de la critique de la recherche de la verité (Critique of the critique of the search for truth) in 1675.

References
 Easton, P., "Robert Desgabets" in Nadler, S. (ed.), A Companion to Early Modern Philosophy (John Wiley & Sons, 2008), pp. 197–209.
 Faye, E., "The Cartesianism of Desgabets and Arnauld and the Problem of Eternal Truths" in Garber & Nadler (eds.), Oxford Studies in Early Modern Philosophy, vol. 2 (Oxford University Press, 2005), pp. 193–210.
 Schmaltz, T., "Desgabets, Robert" in Brochert, D. M. (ed.), Encyclopedia of Philosophy, Second Edition, vol. 2 (Thomson Gale, 2006), pp. 757–760.

External links
 Easton, P., "Robert Desgabets" in Zalta, E. N. (ed.), The Stanford Encyclopedia of Philosophy.

1610 births
1678 deaths
French philosophers
French Benedictines
17th-century philosophers
Catholic philosophers
French male writers